Bone Hill is a summit in Jackson County in the U.S. state of Missouri.

Bone Hill was named from the belief Indian bones were interred there.

References

Landforms of Jackson County, Missouri
Hills of Missouri